Richard Frederick Thompson (June 2, 1873 – September 25, 1949) was a farmer and political figure in Saskatchewan, Canada. He represented Weyburn in the House of Commons of Canada from 1917 to 1921 as a Unionist Party member.

He was born in Grey County, Ontario, the son of Robert Thompson and the former Miss Hunter, and was educated there. He owned a farm at Weyburn, Saskatchewan. Thompson was defeated when he ran for reelection in 1921. He died in Vancouver, British Columbia at the age of 76.

References

Members of the House of Commons of Canada from Saskatchewan
Unionist Party (Canada) MPs
1873 births
1949 deaths